A music scene is any kind of music community. The term may also refer to:

 Indie music scene, a localized independent music-oriented community of bands and their audiences. 
 Music scene (programming),  part of the Demoscene
 The Music Scene (magazine), a Canadian magazine dedicated to promoting classical music and jazz
 The Music Scene (TV series), a TV show that aired in 1969
 The Music Scene (album), an album by American producer Blockhead